Pierre-Hugues Herbert and Nicolas Mahut defeated Rajeev Ram and Joe Salisbury in the final, 6–4, 7–6(7–0) to win 
the doubles tennis title at the 2021 ATP Finals. It was their second ATP Finals title.

Wesley Koolhof and Nikola Mektić were the reigning champions, but only Mektić qualified this season after playing with Mate Pavić. Mektić and Pavić lost in the semifinals to Ram and Salisbury.

Pavić secured the individual year-end No. 1 ranking after winning two round-robin matches. Salisbury was also in contention for the top ranking.

For the first time since 2007, the top four seeded teams reached the semifinals.

Seeds

Alternates

Draw

Finals

Green group

Red group

Standings are determined by: 1. number of wins; 2. number of matches; 3. in two-teams-ties, head-to-head records; 4. in three-teams-ties, percentage of sets won, then percentage of games won; 5. ATP rankings.

References

External links 
Official website
Group standings
Doubles draw

Doubles